Muhammad Mukhairi Ajmal bin Mahadi (born November 7, 2001) is a Malaysian professional footballer who plays as a central midfielder for Malaysia Super League club Selangor and the Malaysia national team.

Mukhairi began his senior club career playing for PKNP reserve squad, before promoted to the first team in 2019, at the aged of 18. His individual performances led to a move to Selangor in 2020.

Mukhairi represented Malaysia at under-19 level, before making his debut for under-23 level in 2021. He has been called up to the senior Malaysia squad, and made his senior international debut in October 2021.

Club career

Early career
Born in Sungai Lembing, Pahang, Mukhairi begin his career with attended the Pahang Malaysian Sports School, and trained there until he was 15, before transferring to Tunku Mahkota Ismail Sports School (SSTMI) in Johor for the final two years of his formal secondary education.

PKNP

Upon graduating at the end of 2018, Mukhairi signed for Super League side PKNP on a one-year contract with an option for an extra year. He making his league and first team debut, against PKNS on 23 February 2019, at the age 17 years, three months and 16 days, coming on as a substitute in the 67th minute. Later, he scored his first professional goal on 29 September 2019 in an 4–1 loss against Kedah at Darulaman Stadium in Malaysia Cup tournament. By this time, his performance was soon attracting attention from several Malaysia Super League clubs, until he was approached by Selangor, who planned to sign him to their reserve team.

Selangor

On 25 December 2019, Mukhairi moved to joined Selangor, being initially assigned to the Selangor II in Malaysia Premier League. The following 14 July 2020, after made several appearances for reserve team, he was promoted outright by the Red Giants first team. Mukhairi made his first team – and Super League – debut for Selangor on 3 October 2020, starting in a 7–0 away victory over PDRM. On second season with the club, he scored his first goal in the league match against Sri Pahang in a 3–1 win on 6 March 2021. He managed to make a significant impact in most games and came away with a respectable played in twenty games in the league matches and provide one goal and one assist for the club.

In his third season, Mukhairi began wearing the number 7 shirt for Selangor in 2022, signalling coach Michael Feichtenbeiner's intent to use him as his main box-to-box and playmaker. On 1 October, Mukhairi scored with a powerful shot from 25 yards in the 32nd minute against Melaka United. The goal later earned him the Best Goal of the Malaysian League 2022 for the goal of the year. On 16 November, the 21-year-old provided all three assists corner for Richmond Ankrah, Caion and Sharul Nazeem's goal in a 3–1 win against Terengganu at Malaysia Cup semi-final, to take his assist tally to 9. Mukhairi finished his third season with concluding 3 goals and 9 top assist for the club, in 32 appearances across all competitions.

Prior to the 2023 season, Mukhairi was given the squad number 10 following the release of Caion, the club's previous number 10. He joined a famous list of players to wear the number 10, most notably the late Mokhtar Dahari, a legend striker of the squad who hold the record as the top scorer for the club with 177 goals.

International career

Youth
At the youth international level, Mukhairi was the part of national team under-19 to helped the squad finish runners up in the 2019 AFF U-18 Youth Championship, before helped squad to qualified for the 2020 AFC U-19 Championship finals.

Senior
On 23 September 2021, Mukhairi received his first call-up to the senior national team, for central training and friendly matches against Jordan and Uzbekistan. He made his senior international debut on 6 October 2021, replacing Nazmi Faiz in the 61st minute of a 4–0 loss against Jordan.

Style of play
Primarily a central midfielder, he is also capable of playing on the left flank, in a holding role, as a deep-lying playmaker, in a box-to-box role, or even as an attacking midfielder. During his season with Selangor, Mukhairi was deployed in a more advanced and creative midfield role rather than in his usual box-to-box role, which saw him gain more time on the ball, and he excelled as the team's main playmaker, due to his vision and  passing range. His performances in this role saw him develop from a promising youngster into one of the best and most complete midfielders in Malaysian League. Upon Mukhairi's departure from PKNP in 2020, his former coach, Abu Bakar Fadzim stating that he "...as a young player who has a high level of intellectual intelligence (IQ), and he can even plan a match and think in a short period of time before making a pass". Mukhairi is also effective at taking set pieces, particularly corners or wide free kicks.

Career statistics

Club

International

Honours

Club
Selangor
 Malaysia Cup runner-up: 2022

International
Malaysia U19
 AFF U-19 Youth Championship runner-up: 2019

Malaysia
King's Cup runner-up: 2022

References

External links
 

2001 births
Living people
Malaysian footballers
PKNP FC players
Malaysia Super League players
Association football midfielders
Malaysia youth international footballers
People from Pahang
Competitors at the 2021 Southeast Asian Games
Southeast Asian Games competitors for Malaysia